Computable knowledge may refer to:

 Knowledge-based systems
 Reasoning system
 Semantic reasoner
 Inference engine
 Knowledge representation and reasoning
 Automated reasoning
 Question answering
 Logic programming